Cuspivolva allynsmithi is a species of sea snail in the family Ovulidae, the ovulids, cowry allies or false cowries.

References

 Lorenz F. & Fehse D. (2009) The living Ovulidae. A manual of the families of allied cowries: Ovulidae, Pediculariidae and Eocypraeidae. Hackenheim: Conchbooks.

Ovulidae
Gastropods described in 1978